The Women's time trial H4-5 road cycling event at the 2016 Summer Paralympics took place on 14 September at Flamengo Park, Pontal. eleven riders competed.

The H4 category and H5 category are for cyclists using handcycles because of lower limb dysfunction or amputation.

Results : Women's road time trial H4-5

References

Women's road time trial H4-5